HC Neumarkt-Egna is an ice hockey team in Neumarkt, Italy. They play in the Alps Hockey League and formerly the Serie A. The club was founded in 1963.

Honours
Inter-National League:
Winners (1): 2013–14

External links
Official website

1963 establishments in Italy
Ice hockey clubs established in 1963
Ice hockey teams in Italy
Inter-National League teams
Sport in South Tyrol